WNVM (97.7 FM), branded on-air as Nueva Vida FM, is a radio station licensed to serve Cidra, Puerto Rico.  The station is owned by New Life Broadcasting, Inc.

WNVM broadcasts a contemporary Christian music format to all of Puerto Rico.

Known as WBRQ from its founding in 1972 until 2009, this station was assigned the WNVM call letters by the Federal Communications Commission on January 27, 2009.

The station is relayed through booster station, WNVM-FM1 in Cayey, which also broadcasts at 97.7 FM.

List of Nueva Vida stations

Nueva Vida TV
On November 14, 2013, OptimaVision launched WNTE-LD Channel 36. WVTE-LD (now WZNA-LD) Channel 3 followed on March 24, 2014. WQHA Channel 50 (formerly a repeater for WUJA) was sold for $29 million to Western New Life, Inc. on May 2, 2014, and became the third channel in the network. NCN Television moved its programming to digital subchannel 50.2. On January 1, 2018, OptimaVision relaunched as Zona TV. As of March 2020, the stations now used the Nueva Vida TV branding.

List of Nueva Vida TV stations
 WZNA-LD Channel 3.1 Guaynabo, Puerto Rico (New Life Broadcasting flagship station)
 WKHD-LD Channel 15.1 Mayaguez, Puerto Rico (secondary station)
 W06DA-D Channel 6.1 Aguada, Puerto Rico (translator station)
 WQHA Channel 25.1 Aguada, Puerto Rico (Owned by Western New Life, Inc.)

TAB Deportes 101.3
TAB Deportes began broadcasting on October 18, 2013, with 18 hours a day of sports programming, including from Tiro Al Blanco. TAB Deportes was transmitting on W267BL 101.3 FM & WNVM 97.7 FM HD3. On February 24, 2014 TAB Deportes ceased operations after 5 months on the air, and will replace WUJA's audio signal on 101.3FM. On June 15, 2014, W267BL changed its callsign & frequency to W268BK 101.5FM. Currently, W268BK is owned by Caguas Educational TV, inc., the owners of WUJA.

Logos

References

External links

Radio stations established in 1972
Evangelical radio stations
NVM
1972 establishments in Puerto Rico
Cidra, Puerto Rico